Julius Morris (born 14 April 1994) is a Montserratian sprinter. He competed in the 200 metres at the 2015 World Championships in Beijing. He holds national records on several distances.

Competition record

Personal bests
Outdoor
100 metres – 10.12 (+1.8 m/s, Houston, TX 2018) NR
200 metres – 20.28 (+ m/s, El Paso 2017) NR
Indoor
60 metres – 6.74 (Nashville 2016) NR
200 metres – 20.99 (Birmingham, AL 2016) NR
400 metres – 49.31 (Nashville, AL 2015) NR

References

External links

1994 births
Living people
Montserratian male sprinters
World Athletics Championships athletes for Montserrat
Commonwealth Games competitors for Montserrat
Athletes (track and field) at the 2014 Commonwealth Games
Athletes (track and field) at the 2018 Commonwealth Games
Athletes (track and field) at the 2022 Commonwealth Games